Events in the year 2022 in Liechtenstein.

Incumbents 

 Prince: Hans-Adam II
 Regent: Alois
 Prime Minister: Daniel Risch

Events 
Ongoing – COVID-19 pandemic in Liechtenstein

 4 April – Russia restricts diplomats, journalists, and politicians from the European Union, Iceland, Norway, Switzerland, and Liechtenstein from obtaining a visa by a simplified procedure.
 20 May – A heat wave sweeps Western Europe, with settlements in France, Switzerland, Liechtenstein and western Austria beating all-time high records for the month.
 26 June – A referendum was held in which voters decided on an exemption for pensioners from paying the annual deductible of the national health insurance.
 18 September – A referendum was held in which votes decided against maintaining COVID-19 restrictions.

Sports

2022–23 Liechtenstein Cup

Round of 16 

 16 August
 FC Vaduz III 1 – 6 FC Schaan
 FC Ruggell II  1 – 1 (a.e.t.) (4 - 5 p) FC Vaduz II 
 FC Triesenberg  5 – 3 FC Triesen
 USV Eschen/Mauren II 0 - 9 FC Balzers 
 17 August
 FC Ruggell 1 - 4 USV Eschen/Mauren 
 FC Schaan II 3 - 7 USV Eschen/Mauren III
 FC Triesenberg II 1 - 4 FC Balzers II 
 31 August
 FC Triesen II 0 - 18 FC Vaduz

Quarterfinals 

 20 September
 USV Eschen Mauren III - FC Valduz
 11 October
 FC Balzers II - FC Schaan
 12 October
 FC Vaduz II - FC Balzers
 FC Triesenberg - USV Eschen/Mauren

See also 

 COVID-19 pandemic in Europe
 2022 in the European Union
 City states

References 

 
2020s in Liechtenstein
Years of the 21st century in Liechtenstein
Liechtenstein
Liechtenstein